Hans Wehrli (19 March 1927 – 16 October 2011) was a Swiss sprinter. He competed in the men's 100 metres at the 1952 Summer Olympics.

Competition record

References

1927 births
2011 deaths
Athletes (track and field) at the 1952 Summer Olympics
Swiss male sprinters
Olympic athletes of Switzerland
Place of birth missing